Lunghwa University of Science and Technology (LHU) is a private university of science and technology in the Taiwanese vocational education system, originally based in Guishan District, Taoyuan City, Taiwan.

As its spirit of fundamental of initial creation in its school song, "a technical skill can be valued unlimitedly; both hands can be creating infinitely for country." 

Popular undergraduate majors at LHU include electronics, business, mechanic, engineering, finance, philology, international business, industrial management, multi-media and gaming science, tourism and leisure science and computer science. Popular fields of study among graduate students include electronics, engineering, computer science and finance.
LHU claims to provide HTC, TSMC, UMC and other famous firms with more engineering, computer science and business graduates than any other college or university, and philanthropic support of LHU is among the highest in the Taiwanese vocational education system and technical education system.

Colleges and departments

There are three colleges at LHU.

College of Engineering
Department of Mechanical Engineering
Department of Chemical and Materials Engineering
Department of Electrical Engineering
Department of Electronic Engineering
Department of Computer Information and Network Engineering

College of Management
Department of International Business
Department of Finance
Department of Business Administration
Department of Information Management
Department of Industrial Management

College of Humanities and Design
Department of Applied Foreign Languages
Department of Multimedia and Game Science
Department of Cultural Creativity and Digital Media Design
Department of Tourism and Recreation

Sister universities
Sister schools of Lunghwa include:

Alumni
 Chan I-hua – performed self-immolation on May 19, 1989 when the funeral procession of fellow activist Cheng Nan-jung (who had similarly immolated himself) was blocked by the police in front of the Presidential Office Building in Taipei on what is now called Ketagalan Boulevard.
 Chi Po-lin – photographer and film director

See also
 List of universities in Taiwan
 List of universities in Taoyuan County, Taiwan

References

External links

 Lunghwa University of Science and Technology website